Xu Limin is a Chinese basketball coach of the Chinese national team, which he coached at the 2017 FIBA Women's Asia Cup.

References

Chinese basketball coaches
Living people
Year of birth missing (living people)
Place of birth missing (living people)
Olympic coaches